The World Trade Center Bangalore (WTCB) is a building complex located in Malleswaram West, Bangalore, India, which was opened for operation in 2010. Built by Brigade Group who obtained the WTCA license for its construction, the building became the second World Trade Center in India after the one in Mumbai. At 128 m, the WTCB was the tallest commercial building in south India from 2010 till 2015 and the tallest building in Bangalore between 2010 and 2013. The building is part of an integrated enclave called "Brigade Gateway", along with Orion Mall, Manipal Hospital, Sheraton Hotel, Brigade School and Brigade Gateway Apartments.

The WTCB is close to ISKCON Temple, Indian Institute of Science, Yesvantpur Junction railway station and Sandal Soap Factory metro station.

Gallery

See also
 List of world trade centers
List of tallest buildings in Bangalore
List of tallest buildings in India

References

External links
 Official website

Bangalore
Buildings and structures in Bangalore
Economy of Bangalore